Roca Entravessada is a mountain of Catalonia. Located in the Pyrenees, at the border between Spain and Andorra, it has an altitude of 2928 metres above sea level.

The name of the mountain means "Rock Askew" in the Catalan language. One of the routes to reach it passes by the Estanys Forcats from Arinsal, Andorra.

See also
Pyrenees
Mountains of Catalonia

References

External links
Information 

Mountains of Catalonia
Mountains of the Pyrenees
Mountains of Andorra
Two-thousanders of Andorra
Two-thousanders of Spain